James Caldwell (1839–1925) was a Scottish politician. He served as an MP for two constituencies, both in Glasgow.

He was first elected for Glasgow St Rollox in 1886 as a Liberal Unionist.  During his term he went over to the Liberals, and in 1892 he stood for re-election not in his own constituency but in Glasgow Tradeston, where he was narrowly defeated.

He was then elected as Liberal MP for Mid-Lanarkshire at a by-election in 1894, where he served until January 1910, when he stood down.

Caldwell took an interest in development issues in the Highlands and Islands. In the spring of 1889, he undertook a trip to mainland Ross-shire and Lewis to gather information on obstacles to the development of the West Coast fishing industry.  On the journey from Inverness to Ullapool, he was accompanied by Murdoch Paterson, chief engineer of the Highland Railway Company.

References

External links 
 

1839 births
1925 deaths
Members of the Parliament of the United Kingdom for Glasgow constituencies
UK MPs 1886–1892
UK MPs 1892–1895
UK MPs 1895–1900
UK MPs 1900–1906
UK MPs 1906–1910
Liberal Unionist Party MPs for Scottish constituencies
Scottish Liberal Party MPs
19th-century Scottish people
Members of the Privy Council of the United Kingdom